The following is a list of notable events and releases of the year 1916 in Norwegian music.

Events

Deaths

 May
 11 – Christian Cappelen, organist and composer (born 1845).

Births

 January
 12 – Arne Sletsjøe, bratsjist in the Filharmonisk Selskaps orkester (died 1999).
 22 – Arnljot Kjeldaas, composer and organist (died 1997).

 June
 27 
 Hallvard Johnsen, composer and flutist (died 2003).
Robert Normann, jazz guitarist (died 1998).

 November 
 15 – Greta Gynt, singer, dancer and actress (died 2000).

 December
 19 – Ørnulf Gulbransen, flautist and music teacher (died 2004).

See also
 1916 in Norway
 Music of Norway

References

 
Norwegian music
Norwegian
Music
1910s in Norwegian music